Soulbender is the only studio album by the American-Canadian metal band of the same name. Originally released in 2004, it was re-released with additional recordings in 2014.

Background and recording
Soulbender features Michael Wilton, founding guitarist of Queensrÿche, and Nick Pollock, former vocalist of My Sister's Machine. The album was recorded at three different studios in Washington: Triad (drums and bass), which also mixed the album, Watershed (guitars), and Slow Time (vocals). This album was co-produced by the band themselves and engineer Eric Janko. It was mastered by Eddy Schreyer, who has worked with artists such as Alice in Chains and Slipknot.

Release and reception

The album was independently released through Licking Lava Records on May 22, 2004. Steve Newton of The Georgia Straight has described the music on this album being "a tad darker than either of those bands (Queensrÿche and My Sister's Machine) are noted for." Sefany Jones, a contributing editor of KNAC, listed the album among her Top 15 albums of 2004; it came in at Number Two.

Rerelease
In 2014, Blabbermouth.net reported that the band were planning to release Soulbender II, containing four new songs and remasters of all tracks on Soulbender, through Rat Pak Records. The album also included updated cover art. Tony Sison of The Dedicated Rocker Society hailed Soulbender II as a "balls to the wall recording from start to finish."

Track listing
All tracks written by Soulbender.

Personnel

 Soulbender
 Dave Groves – guitar
 Wes Hallam – drums
 Nick Pollock – vocals, design, layout
 Marten Van Keith – bass guitar
 Michael Wilton – guitar

 Additional personnel and production
 Eric Janko – Producer
 Eddy Schreyer – Mastering
 Emma Burke, Sofie Dissel, Toshiko Okumura – Spoken vocals
 Jeremy Cranford, Corey D. Macourek, Scott Norris, Robert Raper – Design and layout

References

External links

See also
 2004 in music
 Queensrÿche

2004 debut albums
Soulbender albums